Richard Creagh (born at Limerick early in the sixteenth century; died in the Tower of London about December 1586) was an Irish Roman Catholic clergyman who was the Archbishop of Armagh and Primate of All Ireland in the second half of the sixteenth century.

Life

The son of a merchant, his family (see Creagh) were Gaelic-Irish but had lived in Limerick town for some generations. He followed the same calling in his youth and made many voyages to Spain. A providential escape from shipwreck led him to embrace a religious life, and after some years of study abroad, he was ordained a priest. Returning to Ireland, he taught school for a time at Limerick. 

He refused nominations for the See of Limerick and See of Cashel, but the Papal nuncio, David Wolfe, determined to conquer his humility, named him for the primacy when it became vacant, and would accept no refusal. Creagh was consecrated at Rome, and in 1564 returned to Ireland as Archbishop of Armagh. 

Shane O'Neill was then the most potent of the Ulster chiefs. From the first, he and Creagh disagreed. O'Neill hated England; Creagh preached loyalty to England in Armagh Cathedral, even in O'Neill's presence. O'Neill retorted by burning down the cathedral. 

Creagh then cursed him and refused to absolve him because he had put a priest to death. Shane retaliated by threatening the life of the primate, and by declaring publicly that there was no one on earth he hated so much as Creagh, except Queen Elizabeth I, whom he confessed he hated more. 

In spite of all this, Creagh was arrested and imprisoned by the English. Twice he escaped, but he was retaken and in 1567 lodged in the Tower of London, and kept there till his death. From his repeated examinations before the English Privy Council his enmity for Shane O'Neill and his unwavering loyalty to England were made plain. But his steadfastness in the Catholic faith and his popularity in Ireland were considered crimes, and in consequence, the Council refused to set him free. 

Not content with this, his enemies assailed his moral character. The daughter of his jailer was urged to charge him with having assaulted her. The charge was investigated in public court, where the girl retracted, declaring her accusation absolutely false.

Death

It has been said that Creagh was poisoned in prison, and this, whether true or false, was widely believed at the time of his death. The principal suspect was the notorious double agent Robert Poley, best known for his role as agent provocateur in the Babington Plot and his suspected role in the killing of Christopher Marlowe. Poley, who was a fellow prisoner in the Tower during Creagh's last years there, is said to have visited him several times, but the suspicion seems to be based on his general bad character, rather than on any direct evidence of his guilt.

Peter Creagh
His grand-nephew, Peter Creagh, was Bishop of Cork and Cloyne from 1676 to 1693. He was imprisoned for two years on suspicion of treason and attempted regicide during the Popish Plot in consequence of the false accusations of Titus Oates, but he was acquitted (1682). He was transferred to the Archdiocese of Tuam in 1686. After the Glorious Revolution, he followed James II of England to the Continent, was appointed Archbishop of Dublin in 1693, but was never able to return and take possession of his archdiocese. He became Coadjutor Bishop of Strasbourg, where he died (July 1705).

Works
Creagh wrote:
De Linguâ Hibernicâ; some collections from this work are among the manuscripts in the library of Trinity College Dublin.
An Ecclesiastical History; a portion of this work was, in Sir James Ware's time, in the possession of Thomas Arthur, M.D.
A Catechism in Irish, 1560.
Account, in Latin, of his escape from the Tower of London, 1565. In Cardinal Moran's Spicilegium Ossoriense, i. 40.
De Controversiis Fidei
Topographia Hiberniæ
Vitæ Sanctorum Hiberniæ

External links

References

Attribution

1586 deaths
Clergy from Limerick (city)
Roman Catholic archbishops of Armagh
16th-century Irish bishops
People of Elizabethan Ireland
Prisoners in the Tower of London
Irish people who died in prison custody
Year of birth missing